The 1991 Seniors' British Open was a professional golf tournament for players aged 50 and above and the fifth Senior British Open, held from 11 to 14 July at Royal Lytham & St Annes Golf Club in Lytham St Annes, Lancashire, England, United Kingdom.

In 2018, the tournament was, as all Senior British Open Championships played 1987–2002, retroactively recognized as a senior major golf championship and a PGA Tour Champions (at the time named the Senior PGA Tour) event.

50-year-old Bobby Verwey won his first Seniors' British Open and first senior major championship.

Venue 

The event was the first Senior Open Championship of four in a row held at Royal Lytham & St Annes Golf Club.

There were windy weather conditions on the course during the tournament.

Field

Past champions in the field
All three past Senior British Open champions participated. All of them made the 36-hole cut, 1989 champion Bob Charles (tied 2nd), 1988 and 1990 champion Gary Player (tied 5th) and 1987 champion Neil Coles (tied 7th),

Final results 
Sunday, 14 July 1991

Bobby Verwey led by one stroke going in to the last round, ahead of defending champion Gary Player and English home players Peter Butler and Tommy Horton. On the last hole of the last round, Verwey drove into a fairway bunker and played out safe to put his third shot on the green. He sank an 8-foot putt for a par 4 and a 1-under-par final round of 70. With his 72-hole-score one over par, he beat Bob Charles, who finished with 67, and Horton by one stroke.

(a) denotes amateur 

Source:

References

External links 
 Coverage on European Tour website

Senior major golf championships
Golf tournaments in England
Seniors' British Open
Seniors' British Open
Seniors' British Open